Teaching Public Administration is a biannual peer-reviewed academic journal that covers the field of education as relating to public administration. The editors-in-chief are John Diamond (Edge Hill University) and Catherine Farrell (University of Glamorgan). It was established in 1976 as Public Administration Teacher and was edited by Derek Gregory. In 1977 the journal changed its name to Teaching Public Administration. Under the editorship of Michael Hunt Sheffield Hallam University) the journal ceased operations in 2009. In 2012, the journal was revitalized, with SAGE Publications taking over as publisher in association with the Public Administration Committee (PAC) of the Joint University Council of the Applied Social Sciences.

Editors-in-chief
The following persons have been editors-in-chief:

Abstracting and indexing
The journal is abstracted and indexed in:
 Education Resources Information Center
 Emerging Sources Citation Index
 Scopus
 Public Affairs Index

See also
List of public administration journals

References

External links 
 
 UK Joint University Council Public Administration Committee

SAGE Publishing academic journals
English-language journals
Education journals
Publications established in 1976
Biannual journals
Public administration journals
Academic journals associated with learned and professional societies of the United Kingdom
Academic journals associated with learned and professional societies